The University of Northern Iowa Gallery of Art is an art gallery at the University of Northern Iowa in Cedar Falls, housed in the Kamerick Art Building on West 27th Street.

Collections
The permanent collection of the gallery includes works by Berenice Abbott, Josef Albers, Eugène Atget, Romare Bearden, John Buck, Harold Eugene Edgerton, George Grosz, Philip Guston, R. B. Kitaj, Pablo Picasso, and Jerry Uelsmann. The current director is Darrell Taylor. The gallery hosts a rotating series of lectures and exhibitions.

References

External links
Official website

Art museums and galleries in Iowa
University of Northern Iowa
Museums in Black Hawk County, Iowa
Buildings and structures in Cedar Falls, Iowa